Tein Hlwar Mhot Mhot Lwin is a 1968 Burmese black-and-white drama film, directed by San Shwe Maung starring Win Oo, Myint Myint Khin, Aung Lwin, Khin Lay Swe and Phoe Par Gyi.

Cast
Win Oo as Kyaw Soe Moe
Myint Myint Khin as Kay Thi
Aung Lwin as Dr. Thant Zin
Khin Lay Swe as Mya Khin
Phoe Par Gyi as U Mg Par Gyi

References

1968 films
1960s Burmese-language films
Films shot in Myanmar
Burmese black-and-white films
1968 drama films
Burmese drama films